Yue is a group of similar Sinitic languages spoken in Southern China, particularly in Liangguang (the Guangdong and Guangxi provinces).

The name Cantonese is often used for the whole group, but linguists prefer to reserve that name for the variety used in Guangzhou (Canton), Wuzhou (Ngchow), Hong Kong and Macau, which is the prestige dialect. Taishanese, from the coastal area of Jiangmen (Kongmoon) located southwest of Guangzhou, was the language of most of the 19th-century emigrants from Guangdong to Southeast Asia and North America. Most later migrants have been speakers of Cantonese.

Yue varieties are not mutually intelligible with other varieties of Chinese. They are among the most conservative varieties with regard to the final consonants and tonal categories of Middle Chinese, but have lost several distinctions in the initial consonants and medial glides that other Chinese varieties have retained.

Naming 
The prototypical use of the name Cantonese in English is for the Yue variety of Guangzhou (Canton), but it is also used for Yue as a whole. To avoid confusion, academic texts may call the primary branch of Chinese "Yue", following the Mandarin pinyin spelling, and either restrict "Cantonese" to its common usage for the Guangzhou variety, or avoid the term "Cantonese" altogether and distinguish Yue from Guangzhou (Canton) dialect.

In Chinese, people of Hong Kong and Macau, as well as Cantonese immigrants abroad, usually call their language Gwóngdūng wá  (廣東話) "speech of Guangdong". The people of Guangdong and Guangxi also use the term Yuht Yúh  (粵語) "Yue language" and the term baahk wá , as for example in an expression like "南寧白話", which means the "baak waa of Nanning".

History
The area of China south of the Nanling Mountains, known as the Lingnan (roughly modern Guangxi and Guangdong), was originally home to peoples known to the Chinese as the Hundred Yue (Baiyue). Large-scale Han Chinese migration to the area began after the Qin conquest of the region in 214 BC. Successive waves of immigration followed at times of upheaval in Northern and Central China, such as the collapse of the Han, Tang and Song dynasties. The most popular route was via the Xiang River, which the Qin had connected to the Li River by the Lingqu Canal, and then into the valley of the Xi Jiang (West River). A secondary route followed the Gan River and then the Bei Jiang (North River) into eastern Guangdong. Yue-speakers were later joined by Hakka-speakers following the North River route, and Min-speakers arriving by sea.

After the fall of Qin, the Lingnan area was part of the independent state of Nanyue for about a century, before being incorporated in the Han empire in 111 BC. After the Tang dynasty collapsed, much of the area became part of the state of Southern Han, one of the longest-lived states of the Five Dynasties and Ten Kingdoms, between 917 and 971.

Large waves of Chinese migration throughout succeeding Chinese dynasties assimilated huge numbers of Yue aborigines, with the result that today's Southern Han Chinese Yue-speaking population is descended from both groups. The colloquial layers of Yue varieties contain elements influenced by the Tai languages formerly spoken widely in the area and still spoken by people such as the Zhuang or the Dong.

Rise of Cantonese
The port city of Guangzhou lies in the middle of Pearl River Delta, with access to the interior via the West River, North River and East River, which all converge at the delta. It has been the economic centre of the Lingnan region since Qin times, when it was an important shipbuilding centre. By 660, it was the largest port in China, part of a trade network stretching as far as Arabia. During the Southern Song, it also became the cultural centre of the region. Like many other Chinese varieties it developed a distinct literary layer associated with the local tradition of reading the classics. The Guangzhou dialect (Cantonese) was used in the popular Yuèōu, Mùyú and Nányīn folksong genres, as well as Cantonese opera.
There was also a small amount of vernacular literature, written with Chinese characters extended with a number of non-traditional characters for Cantonese words.

Guangzhou became the centre of rapidly expanding foreign trade after the maritime ban was lifted, with the British East India Company establishing a chamber of commerce in the city in 1715.
The ancestors of most of the Han Chinese population of Hong Kong came from Guangzhou after the territory was ceded to Britain in 1842. As a result, Hong Kong Cantonese, the most widely spoken language in Hong Kong and Macau, is an offshoot of the Guangzhou dialect. The popularity of Cantonese-language media, Cantopop and the Cinema of Hong Kong has since led to substantial exposure of Cantonese to China and the rest of Asia. On the Mainland, the national policy is to promote Standard Chinese, which is also the medium of instruction in schools. The place of local Cantonese language and culture remains contentious. In 2010, a controversial proposal to switch some programming on Guangzhou local television from Cantonese to Mandarin was abandoned following widespread backlash accompanied by public protests.

Languages and dialects
Yue languages are spoken in the southern provinces of Guangdong and Guangxi, an area long dominated culturally and economically by the city of Guangzhou (Canton) at the delta of the Pearl River. The Cantonese variety, also spoken in Hong Kong and Macau, is the prestige variety of Yue.

One of these coastal languages, Taishanese, is the most common Yue variety among overseas communities. Yue varieties are not totally mutually intelligible with one another.

Classification

In Yuan Jiahua's dialect manual (1962), Yue dialects were divided into five groups:
 Yuehai, covering the Pearl River Delta and Xi River valley.
 Siyi (Seiyap "four counties"), in the coastal prefecture of Jiangmen to the southwest of Guangzhou.
 Gao–Lei, in southwestern Guangdong.
 Qin–Lian (Hamlim) in southern Guangxi.
 Guinan, in southwestern Guangxi.

In the Language Atlas of China, some varieties spoken in western Guangxi formerly classified as Yue are placed in a separate Pinghua group.
The remaining Yue dialects are divided into seven groups.
Three groups are found in the watershed of the Pearl River:

 Guangfu includes Cantonese proper, spoken in Guangzhou, Hong Kong and Macau, as well as the dialects of surrounding areas in the Pearl River Delta such as Zhongshan, Foshan, Dongguan, Zhuhai and Shenzhen, and in southern parts of the inland prefectures of Zhaoqing and Qingyuan and in parts of Guangxi such as the city of Wuzhou.
 Gou–Lou (Ngau–Lau) dialects are spoken in inland areas of western Guangdong and eastern Guangxi, and include the dialect of Yulin (Bobai).
 Yong–Xun (Yuhng–Cham) is spoken mainly in the Yong–Yu–Xun valley in Guangxi, including the provincial capital Nanning.

The remaining four groups are found in coastal areas:

 Siyi (Sze Yap) dialects are spoken in the coastal prefecture of Jiangmen to the southwest of Guangzhou.  They include the Taishan variety, also known as Taishanese, which was ubiquitous in American Chinatowns before the 1970s.
 Gao–Yang dialects are spoken in areas of southwestern Guangdong such as Yangjiang and Lianjiang.
 Wu–Hua is spoken mainly in western Guangdong around Wuchuan and Huazhou.
 Qin–Lian dialects are spoken in the southern Guangxi areas of Beihai, Qinzhou and Fangcheng.

Anne Yue-Hashimoto has proposed an alternative classification based on a wider sampling of features:
 Pearl River Delta
 Northern
 Sanyi–Zhaoqing: dialects of Foshan and southeast Zhaoqing
 Interior: western part of the Pearl River catchment, including the Atlas'''s Gou–Lou and southern Pinghua dialects.
 Guangfu
 Core: Cantonese proper (Guangzhou, Hong Kong Cantonese)
 Interior: Gao–Yang dialects of Maoming and the Yong–Xun dialects of Nanning and Guiping.
 Southern
 Zhongshan, including Shiqi dialect
 Guan–Lian: dialects of the east delta region (Dongguan and the New Territories) as well as the coastal Guangxi dialects classified as Qin–Lian in the Atlas.
 Interior: Huazhou, Wuchuan, Yulin
 Wuyi–Liangyang
 Wuyi
 Xin–En: Xinhui, Taishan, Enping and the neighbouring Doumen District.
 Kai-He: Kaiping and Heshan.
 Liangyang: Yangjiang and Yangchun (the eastern part of the Atlas's Gao–Yang area)

The Dapeng dialect is a Cantonese-Hakka mixed language spoken by 3,000 to 5,500 people in Dapeng, Shenzhen.

Cantonese

The Guangzhou (Canton) dialect of Yuehai, usually called "Cantonese", is the prestige dialect of Guangdong province and social standard of Yue. It is the most widely spoken dialect of Yue and is an official language of Hong Kong and of Macau, alongside English and Portuguese respectively. It is the lingua franca of not only Guangdong province but also of overseas Cantonese emigrants, though in many areas abroad it is numerically second to the Taishanese dialect of Yue.

By law, Mandarin (Putonghua or guoyu) is the standard language of mainland China and Taiwan and is taught nearly universally as a supplement to local languages such as Cantonese in Guangdong and Guangxi. In Guangzhou, many distinctively Yue vocabulary items have been replaced with Cantonese pronunciations of corresponding Putonghua terms.

Cantonese is the de facto official language of Hong Kong (along with English) and Macau (along with Portuguese), though legally the official language is just "Chinese".
It is the oral language of instruction in Chinese schools in Hong Kong and Macau, and is used extensively in Cantonese-speaking households. Cantonese-language media (Hong Kong films, television serials, and Cantopop), which exist in isolation from the other regions of China, local identity, and the non-Mandarin speaking Cantonese diaspora in Hong Kong and abroad give the language a unique identity. Colloquial Hong Kong Cantonese often incorporates English words due to historical British influences.

Most wuxia films from Canton are filmed originally in Cantonese and then dubbed or subtitled in Mandarin, English, or both.

Taishanese

When the Chinese government removed the prohibition on emigration in the mid-19th century, many people from rural areas in the coastal regions of Fujian and Guangdong emigrated to Southeast Asia and North America.  Until the late 20th century, the vast majority of Chinese immigrants to North America came from the Siyi (four counties) to the southwest of Guangzhou.
The speech of this region, particularly the Taishan dialect, is thus the most common Yue variety in these areas.
It is only partially understood by speakers of Cantonese.

Phonology

Yue varieties are among the most conservative of Chinese varieties regarding the final consonants and tonal categories of Middle Chinese, so that the rhymes of Tang poetry are clearer in Yue dialects than elsewhere. However they have lost several distinctions in the initial consonants and medial vowels that other Chinese varieties have retained.

Initials and medials
In addition to aspirated and unaspirated voiceless initials, Middle Chinese had a series of voiced initials, but voicing has been lost in Yue and most other modern Chinese varieties apart from Wu and Old Xiang.
In the Guangfu, Siyi and Gao–Yang subgroups, these initials have yielded aspirated consonants in the level and rising tones, and unaspirated consonants in the departing and entering tones.
These initials are uniformly unaspirated in Gou–Lou varieties and uniformly aspirated in Wu–Hua.

In Siyi and eastern Gao–Yang, Middle Chinese  has become a voiceless lateral fricative .

Most Yue varieties have merged the Middle Chinese retroflex sibilants with the alveolar sibilants, in contrast with Mandarin dialects, which have generally maintained the distinction. For example, the words  jiāng and  zhāng are distinguished in Mandarin, but in modern Cantonese they have the same sound, jeung1.

Many Mandarin varieties, including Beijing dialect, have a third sibilant series, formed through a merger of palatalized alveolar sibilants and velars, but this is a recent innovation, which has not affected Yue and other Chinese varieties. For example, 晶, 精, 經 and 京 are all pronounced as jīng in Mandarin, but in Cantonese the first pair is pronounced jīng, and the second pair gīng. The earlier pronunciation is reflected in historical Mandarin romanizations, such as "Peking" (Beijing), "Kiangsi" (Jiangxi) and "Tientsin" (Tianjin).

Nasals can be independent syllables in Yue words, e.g. Cantonese ńgh (五) "five", and m̀h (唔) "not", although Middle Chinese did not have syllables of this type.

In most Yue varieties (except for Tengxian), the rounded medial  has merged with the following vowel to form a monophthong, except after velar initials.

Most Yue varieties have retained the Middle Chinese palatal medial, but in Cantonese it has also been lost to monophthongization, yielding a variety of vowels.

Final consonants and tones
Syllables with vocalic or nasal endings could occur with one of three tonal contours, called level (píng 平), rising (shàng 上) or departing (qù 去). Syllables with final stops were traditionally treated as a fourth tone category, the entering tone (rù 入), because the stops were distributed in the same way as the corresponding final nasals.

While northern and central varieties have lost some of the Middle Chinese final consonants, they are retained by most southern Chinese varieties, though sometimes affected by sound shifts.  They are most faithfully preserved in Yue dialects.
Final stops have disappeared entirely in most Mandarin dialects, including the Beijing-based standard, with the syllables distributed across the other tones.

For example, Cantonese has taahm (譚) and tàahn (壇) versus Mandarin tán, yìhm (鹽) and yìhn (言) versus Mandarin yán, tìm (添) and tìn (天) versus Mandarin tiān, and hàhm (含) and hòhn (寒) versus Mandarin hán.

Middle Chinese is described in contemporary dictionaries as having four tones, where the fourth category, the entering tone, consists of syllables with final stops.
Many modern Chinese varieties contain traces of a split of each of these four tones into two registers, an upper or yīn register from voiceless initials and a lower or yáng register from voiced initials.
Mandarin dialects retain the register distinction only in the level tone, yielding the first and second tones of the standard language (corresponding to the first and fourth tones in Cantonese), but have merged several of the other categories.
Most Yue dialects have retained all eight categories, with a further split of the upper entering tone conditioned by vowel length, as also found in neighbouring Tai dialects.
A few dialects spoken in Guangxi, such as the Bobai dialect, have also split the lower entering tone.

Vocabulary
While most Chinese varieties form compounds consisting of a qualifier followed by a qualified element, Yue dialects use the reverse order.  For example, the Standard Chinese word for "guest" is 客人 kèrén "guest-person", but the same morphemes are interchanged in Cantonese jɐn ha:k, Taishanese ŋin hak and Tengxian jən hɪk. This is generally attributed to the influence of Tai languages, in which modifiers normally follow nouns.
Gender markers for nouns are also suffixed, as in other southern varieties.

Some Yue dialects, including Cantonese, can use the same word bīn-go, meaning "which one", for both "who" and "which".
Other dialects, including Taishanese, use sŭe'' (cognate with the word used in Mandarin) for "who", and words meaning "which one" for "which".

See also
 Cantonese grammar
 Chinese input methods for computers
 Lingnan culture
 Written Cantonese
 Written Chinese
 Languages of China
 List of varieties of Chinese

References

Citations

Works cited

Further reading
詹伯慧 & 张日昇 (1987). 珠江三角洲方言字音对照. Guangzhou: 广东人民出版社. .
詹伯慧 & 张日昇 (1988). 珠江三角洲方言词汇对照. Guangzhou: 广东人民出版社. .
詹伯慧 & 张日昇 (1990). 珠江三角洲方言综述. Guangzhou: 广东人民出版社. .
詹伯慧 & 张日昇 (1994). 粤北十县市粤方言调查报告. Guangzhou: 暨南大学出版社. .
詹伯慧 & 张日昇 (1998). 粤西十县市粤方言调查报告. Guangzhou: 暨南大学出版社. .
谢建猷 (2007). 广西汉语方言研究. Nanning: 广西人民出版社. .
广西壮族自治区地方志编纂委员会 (1998). 广西通志: 汉语方言志(2册). Nanning: 广西人民出版社. , .

External links

 
 

 
Chinese languages in Singapore
Subject–verb–object languages
Articles containing video clips
Varieties of Chinese